Helene Black is a Cypriot artist and curator working with various media. She has had exhibitions in museums and contemporary art centers in Cyprus, Argentina, France, the UK, United States, Japan, Greece, Switzerland, Denmark, Russia and Australia.

Overview

Jurate Macnoriute writes: 
 

whilst Denise Robinson had this to say: "Much of Black's work engages with the altered relation of object and observer in the new visual spaces created by new technologies."

In 2000, Black, in collaboration with Yiannis Colakides, produced the first art interactive CD-ROM in Cyprus, which they called "IDs", and in 2001 their collaboration continued with the production of "Loop", a 6-minute digital video. The CD-ROM was the first one to be acquired by the Cyprus National Gallery.

In 2004, Black co-founded NeMe with Yiannis Colakides and Konstantinos Sophocleous. A year later she co-founded the Independent Museum of Contemporary Art (IMCA), the first itinerant museum in Cyprus. IMCA is a NeMe project which organizes Cypriot and international Art events.

In October 2006, Black and L.A. artist Sheila Pinkel curated "In Transition Cyprus", whilst in January 2008 she curated ISOLOMANIA. Both were international group exhibitions which attracted critical attention from artists and critics alike. In 2008 Black and Pinkel were invited by the National Centre of Contemporary Art (Moscow and Ekaterinburg branches) to present the "In Transition" exhibition in Russia. "In Transition Russia 2008" was developed to include an exhibition at the Museum of Fine Arts Ekaterinburg and NCCA Moscow and an international conference on displacement in Ural State University.

References
 Nikos Papastergiadis, 2006, Spatial Aesthetics, Rivers Oram Press, pp77-78
 Nadia Anaxagorou, 2003, The Sculpture Park in Limassol, Municipality of Limassol, pp50-55
 Arte Povera of Helene Black
 The work of Helene Black
  Critique of Helene Black's work
 SPACE It’s Only Yours Until Helene Black Gets Her Mind On It.
 In transition Cyprus 2006
 Isolomania
 In Transition Russia 2008

External links
 hblack.net – Official website

Living people
Year of birth missing (living people)
Cypriot contemporary artists
Greek Cypriot people
Cypriot women artists